The Nashville Sounds Minor League Baseball team has played in Nashville, Tennessee, since being established in 1978 as an expansion team of the Double-A Southern League. They moved up to Triple-A in 1985 as members of the American Association before joining the Pacific Coast League in 1998. With the restructuring of the minor leagues in 2021, they were placed in the Triple-A East, which became the International League in 2022. The team has utilized 54 coaches throughout its history. These include 27 pitching coaches, 21 hitting coaches, 1 bench coach, 2 bullpen coaches, 2 general coaches, and 1 development coach. As of the 2023 season, the Sounds' coaching staff is led by manager Rick Sweet and includes Jeremy Accardo (pitching), Al LeBoeuf (hitting), Patrick McGuff (bullpen), Liu Rodríguez (general), and Ned Yost IV (general).

The coaches assigned to a minor league team depend on each Major League Baseball organization's development approach. Predominantly, the Sounds' staff has included only pitching and hitting coaches. A pitching coach is responsible for instructing a teams' pitchers in matters of mechanics, pitch selection, and game preparation. During a game, he advises the manager on the condition of pitchers and their arms and serves as an in-game coach for the pitcher currently on the mound. When a manager makes a visit to the mound, he typically is doing so to make a pitching change or to discuss situational defense. However, the pitching coach is the one who usually will visit the mound to calm down the pitcher or to discuss how to pitch to a particular batter. Bullpen coaches have similar responsibilities before and after games. During games, the bullpen coach works with relief pitchers and supervises their warmups in the bullpen. A hitting coach works with players to improve their hitting technique and form. He monitors players' swings during the game and over the course of the season, advising them when necessary between at bats on possible adjustments. He also oversees their performance during practices, cage sessions, and pre-game batting practice. A development coach works to improve player performance through the observation and application of analytics such as player data and scouting information. The role of a bench coach is to do whatever most helps his manager lead the club. They may serve as an in-game adviser to the manager, offering situational advice to assist him in making game decisions. If the manager is ejected, suspended, or otherwise unable to attend a game, the bench coach typically assumes the position of acting manager. Bench coaches may also seek to build a positive culture in the clubhouse, especially in regard to player–coach communication.

Six former Sounds players later served as coaches for the team. Wayne Garland of the 1982 starting rotation returned as pitching coach from 1987 to 1988. Don Cooper, who pitched out of the bullpen in 1980, served as pitching coach from 1994 to 1996. Reliever Steve Wilson retired from the Sounds during the 1995 season and became the team's pitching coach. Fred Dabney, a reliever on the 1993 team, returned to coach pitchers from 2012 to 2014. Éric Gagné, who made two major league rehabilitation starts in 2008, served as bullpen coach in 2019. Jim Henderson, a reliever from 2011 to 2012 and in 2014, returned to the Sounds as pitching coach in 2021. Outfielder Gene Roof (1986) and catcher Buddy Pryor (1987) were player-coaches who coached hitting while also playing on the team. Two coaches also managed the Nashville club. Pitching coach Wayne Garland filled in as interim manager for three games in 1988 after the dismissal of manager Jack Lind. Richie Hebner, who was the hitting coach from 1998 to 2000, became the team's manager for the second half of the 2000 season when Trent Jewett was hired as the Pittsburgh Pirates' third base coach. Four coaches have been selected to participate in the Triple-A All-Star Game: Stan Kyles (2006), Rich Gale (2011), Bob Skube (2014), and Rick Rodriguez (2017).

Pat Dobson's 1980 to 1981 pitching staffs had a 3.18 earned run average (ERA), the lowest recorded under all pitching coaches. Darold Knowles (2001–2004) and Stan Kyles (2005–2008) are the longest-tenured pitching coaches, having each served four full seasons. Hitting coaches Jeff Livesey (2001) and Sandy Guerrero (2009–2011) led their hitters to batting averages of .276, the highest under all hitting coaches. Roger LaFrancois (1993–1996), who coached hitting for four seasons, is the longest-serving hitting coach.

Coaches

Pitching

Hitting

Bullpen

General

Former roles

See also
List of Nashville Sounds managers

Notes
Pitching

Hitting

Other

References

Coaches